Yamar Samb (born 24 September 1952) is a former Senegalese basketball player. Samb competed for Senegal at the 1980 Summer Olympics, where he scored 19 points and grabbed 6 rebounds in 6 games.

References

1952 births
Living people
Senegalese men's basketball players
Olympic basketball players of Senegal
Basketball players at the 1980 Summer Olympics